Irthlingborough is a town on the River Nene in North Northamptonshire, England. It had a population of 8,900 at the 2011 census, and was the smallest town in England to have had a Football League team, Rushden & Diamonds F.C., before the promotion of Forest Green Rovers in 2017. The parish church, St Peter, has a lantern tower, unusual for Northamptonshire churches, which was built to guide travellers across the Nene valley in foggy weather. It also has doors at the four cardinal points and has eight misericords in the chancel.

History
The town's name origin is uncertain. 'Ploughmen's fortification', with the suggestion that oxen were once kept here. Perhaps, 'fortification of Yrtla's people'. Alternatively, the first element may be an Old English 'yrthling', a type of bird such as a wren, wagtail or lapwing. Bird names are frequently used to form compounds with Old English 'burh'.

Irthlingborough was called Yrtlingaburg in the 8th century, Erdiburn in the Domesday Book, and Artleborough later. King Offa of Mercia held court near Irthlingborough circa 790.

John Pyel 
 
John Pyel, the mayor of London in 1372, is believed to have been born at Irthlingborough circa 1310.

Mining
In the past, ironstone was mined near Irthlingborough, and as part of the local ironstone mine, a tunnel was bored between Irthlingborough and nearby Finedon. The tunnel still exists, but the Irthlingborough end has been landscaped over, and the Finedon end sealed with concrete. Irthlingborough railway station closed in 1964 to passengers. http://www.disused-stations.org.uk/i/irthlingborough/index.shtml

Iron ore was mined at Irthlingborough from 1918. The mine was owned and operated by Richard Thomas & Baldwin's Ltd., the ore being sent to  RTB's Redbourne steelworks in Scunthorpe.  The ore was extracted from a system of underground tunnels approximately 80-100ft below the surface. The mine was closed down as no longer economic on 30th September 1965.

Quarrying
More recently, the River Nene floodplains between the town and its neighbour, Higham Ferrers, have been quarried for gravel. Quarrying in the area was extensive, stretching to Northampton in the west (upstream) and Thorpe Waterville in the north-northeast (downstream). The quarries were later left to fill with water to produce artificial lakes.

In 2012, the area was acquired by The Wildlife Trust, and has since been turned into Irthlingborough Lakes and Meadows, a nature reserve. It will be part of the Upper Nene Valley Special Protection Area.

Geography

The A6 used to pass through the town, but was bypassed in the 1930s to the north. The former route is the B5348. Irthlingborough Viaduct was built in 1936 and connects the town to Higham Ferrers and the busy A45. The A45 (former A605) is a more dependable road than the A6, being less twisty and with fewer tractors in the traffic.

Local economy
Whitworths, the home baking and healthy snack products company, has been based in the town since 1886 and employs 310 people at the plant on the B571 ('Wellingborough Road'). Sonifex, a manufacturer of radio broadcast products, has been in the town since its beginning in 1969 and has its research and manufacturing based on Station Road. Dr. Martens has a long history with the town; the manufacturer R. Griggs, owned by Max Griggs, had its head office in the town until production moved to China in 2003, much to the displeasure of the National Union of Knitwear, Footwear & Apparel Trades. In 2003 the company made a loss of £60m, having lost £32m in 2002. The company's office is now in Wollaston. The Wellingborough factory was the first to close in July 2002.

Education
There is an infant school, with nursery attached, a junior school and one secondary school, Huxlow Academy, which has a sixth form that is part of the east Northamptonshire sixth form college.

Sport
Between 2001 and 2006 Irthlingborough held the distinction of being the smallest town to hold a Football League club when Rushden & Diamonds F.C. were promoted to League 2 (Then known as Division 3) after winning the 2000-01 Football Conference title. This was in part due to the funding of local businessman Max Griggs who bankrolled the club in the late 1990s until the mid millennium when he sold to a fans group for just £1 in 2005. The club were relegated from the Football League in 2006 and went out of business in 2011 due to severe financial problems. A successor fans owned club, AFC Rushden & Diamonds, was formed two months after Rushden and Diamonds folded in July 2011. In its first season it had an under-18 youth team which played at Raunds Town F.C., then joining the United Counties League (Step 6 in the FA Pyramid) in a ground share arrangement with Wellingborough Town at the Dog and Duck stadium. Two further promotions followed with AFCRD reaching Step 4. In 2018, having played for one season at Hayden Road ground in Rushden (the former home of Rushden Town before the forming of RDFC in 1992) in another ground share with Rushden and Higham Utd, the club won promotion to the FA's Step 3 Premier Division Central of the Southern Football League. The original stadium, Nene Park, was completely demolished in 2017.

References

External links
 Irthlingborough Historical Society
 A History of Irthlingborough Iron Ore Mine.(for Laptops & Desktops)
 A History of Irthlingborough Iron Ore Mine.(for Mobiles)
 Parish Church of St Peter, Irthlingborough
 BBC page

News items
 Whitworths opens heritage centre in March 2009
 Dr Martens closes in March 2003

 
Towns in Northamptonshire
Civil parishes in Northamptonshire
North Northamptonshire